KIAA1143 is an uncharacterized protein in humans that is encoded by the KIAA1143 gene. it may play a role in cell growth mechanisms and regulation/creation of cytoskeletal structure. This gene is located on chromosome 3 on the minus strand

This protein has a function that is not yet objectively understood. KIAA1143 has no alias and has the longest most functional variant named as uncharacterized protein KIAA1143 isoform 1. The mature mRNA transcript is 5079 Base pairs long while the length of the KIAA1143 protein is 154 amino acids. KIAA1143 has another transcript variant called KIAA1143 variant 2, which contains an alternate 3' terminal exon, resulting in a distinct 3' coding region and 3' UTR, compared to variant 1. The encoded isoform 2 has a distinct C-terminus and is shorter than isoform 1. The KIAA1143 protein belongs to the uncharacterized protein KIAA1143-like Family, and contains DUF4604 domain of unknown function. KIAA1143 has a predicted function of cell structure/mobility by encoding heavy neurofilament subunits in neurons. Immunohistochemistry staining from Thermo Fisher Scientific shows presence of KIAA1143 in a cytokinetic bridge, which is involved in cellular cytokinesis. This indicates KIAA1143 may have a role in regulation of cellular division and/or communication as well.

Gene

Location
KIAA1143 is found on chromosome 3 on the short arm (3p21) and has 3 exons. KIAA1143 is on the Minus Strand. KIAA1143 is on the sense strand and spans from bases 44,690,802-44,819,561. KIAA1143 is located in the gene neighborhood of Zinc finger protein 502, ZNF501, and KIF15

Transcriptional Regulation
The KIAA1143 was found by using 500 bp of nucleotides upstream using UCSC Genome Browser A number of transcription factors with a matrix similarity greater than or equal to 0.5 that are predicted to regulate transcription of KIAA1143 are listed below with their respective binding site:

Expression
KIAA1143 is expressed in all tissues, however, The expression of KIAA1143 is highest in the Ovaries, followed by the brain, thyroid, prostate, and urinary bladder

KIAA1143 is predicted to have subcellular localization in the nucleus

mRNA

Characteristics of Isoform 1
Isoform 1 of KIAA1143 has a 5' UTR region of 17 base pairs and a 3' UTR region of 4597 base pairs. The transcript is 5079 base pairs long

Additional Primary Sequence and Variants (Isoforms)
KIAA1143 has another uncharacterized isoform 2 which contains an alternate 3' terminal exon, resulting in a distinct 3' coding region and 3' UTR, compared to variant 1. The encoded isoform 2 has a distinct C-terminus and is shorter than isoform 1.

Protein
The theoretical molecular weight of the 154amino acid KIAA1143 protein is 17.5kDa and the theoretical pI is 5.84.

Domains, Motifs, and Secondary Structure
Since KIAA1143 is an gene with unknown function, most of the coding gene apart from the promotor and translation start site area is a Domain of unknown function, specifically, DUF4604 Spans amino acids 5-151. KIAA1143 has no Cysteine or tyrosine residues. Cysteine and tyrosine are very good nucleophiles, since they are not present, this gives some light into the possible electrophilic nature of the active site. KIAA1143 has some important Eukaryotic Linear Motif resource (ELM) Domains which give insight into its function. These ELM domains are LIG_BIR_II_1 from amino acids 1-5 and LIG_WRC_WIRS_1 from amino acids 144-149. These domains have importance in apoptotic regulation and actin cytoskeleton rearrangement mechanisms respectively

From Positions 1-10 there is also something called a BIG1 Big-1 (bacterial Ig-like domain 1) domain. Big-1 proteins are surface-expressed proteins that mediate mammalian host cell invasion or attachment. The tandem of Ig-like domains appears to form a rod to link the bacterial outer membrane anchor to the C-terminal lectin-like domain to interact with their receptors in the host cell membrane

Post-Translational Modifications
KIAA1143 is shown to be phosphorylated at positions 2, 50, 68, 113, 115, 116 at either serine or threonine residues. There is a sumoylation consensus at position 76, as well as O-GlcNAc attachment at position 8. There is also an N-myristoylation site from 111-116

Tertiary Structures
The KIAA1143 Tertiary structure is predicted below through iTASSER modeling, with a C score of -2.83. Coloring is similar to alphafold confidence graphing

Protein Interactions
KIAA1143 is experimentally determined to have interactions with EAPP (E2F-associated phosphoprotein), ECD (Ecdysoneless Cell Cycle Regulator), GPATCH1 (Evolutionarily Conserved G-Patch Domain-Containing Protein), PRPF8 (Pre-MRNA-Processing-Splicing Factor 8), WDR83 (Mitogen-Activated Protein Kinase Organizer 1), CEP76 (centrosomal protein 76), and APP (Amyloid-beta precursor protein).

Homology and Evolution

Paralogs
There are no paralogs for KIAA1143

Orthologs
KIAA1143 has homologs in over 200 other organisms, including vertebrates, invertebrates, archaea, KIAA1143 is found in clades of organisms except land plants.

The relative rate of change for KIAA1143 is fairly slow compared to fibrinogen and beta-globin, but not as slow as cytochrome c.

Homologus Domains
The DUF4604 domain in KIAA1143 is conserved across all organisms

Phylogeny
All of the orthologs of KIAA1143 are derived from the same common ancestor

Clinical Significance

Pathology
No diseases have been shown to be directly linked to KIAA1143 to this date.

Disease Association
No Disease Association is observed with KIAA1143 to date.

References